The 1990 Masters Tournament was the 54th Masters Tournament, held April 5–8 at Augusta National Golf Club in Augusta, Georgia.

Nick Faldo won his second consecutive Masters and the third of his six major titles on the second sudden-death playoff hole over Raymond Floyd, the 1976 champion. The playoff began on the tenth hole where both made par. At the next hole, #11, Floyd put his 7-iron approach shot into the pond left of the green, while Faldo hit to within  of the cup; he lagged his birdie putt to within a few inches and tapped in for the win. It foiled Floyd's attempt to win a major in four different decades. Afterward, he said, "This is the most devastating thing that's ever happened to me in my career. I've had a lot of losses, but nothing like this."

Floyd led after each of the second and third rounds and had earned the reputation of being a good front-runner in his career. A birdie on 12 gave Floyd a four-shot lead with six holes to play. Faldo birdied 13, 15, and 16, and Floyd's bogey on 17 left them tied at 10-under par at the end of 72 holes.

It was the third consecutive year that the Masters champion was from the United Kingdom, which had no winners prior to Sandy Lyle's victory in 1988.

Faldo was just the second to win consecutive titles at Augusta, following Jack Nicklaus (1965 and 1966). Both of Faldo's wins came at the second hole of a sudden-death playoff, at the eleventh green. Tiger Woods later won back-to-back Masters in 2001 and 2002. Faldo won his third Masters six years later in 1996, for his sixth and final major title.

Chris Patton was the only amateur to make the cut and tied for 39th place at 296 (+8).

Field
1. Masters champions
Tommy Aaron, George Archer, Seve Ballesteros (3,9), Gay Brewer, Billy Casper, Charles Coody, Ben Crenshaw (9,13), Nick Faldo (3), Raymond Floyd (2), Doug Ford, Bernhard Langer, Sandy Lyle (3), Larry Mize, Jack Nicklaus (9), Arnold Palmer, Gary Player, Craig Stadler (11,13), Tom Watson (9,14), Fuzzy Zoeller

Jack Burke Jr., Bob Goalby, Ben Hogan, Herman Keiser, Cary Middlecoff, Byron Nelson, Henry Picard, Gene Sarazen, Sam Snead, and Art Wall Jr. did not play.

2. U.S. Open champions (last five years)
Andy North, Scott Simpson (10,12), Curtis Strange (9,11,13,14)

3. The Open champions (last five years)
Mark Calcavecchia (13,14), Greg Norman (9,12,13)

4. PGA champions (last five years)
Hubert Green (10), Larry Nelson (10), Jeff Sluman (9), Payne Stewart (9,10,12,13,14), Bob Tway (12,13)

5. U.S. Amateur champion and runner-up
Danny Green (a), Chris Patton (a)

6. The Amateur champion
Stephen Dodd (a)

7. U.S. Amateur Public Links champion
Tim Hobby (a)

8. U.S. Mid-Amateur champion
James Taylor (a)

9. Top 24 players and ties from the 1989 Masters Tournament
Paul Azinger (10,12,13,14), Chip Beck (10,13,14), Fred Couples (12,13,14), David Frost (12,13), Ken Green (12,14), Scott Hoch (10,11,12,13), Tom Kite (10,12,13,14), Jodie Mudd (12,13), José María Olazábal (10), Mark O'Meara (12,13,14), Masashi Ozaki (10), Don Pooley, Tom Purtzer, Mike Reid (11,13), Lee Trevino, Ian Woosnam (10,11)

10. Top 16 players and ties from the 1989 U.S. Open
Brian Claar, Peter Jacobsen (12), Mark Lye, Mark McCumber (12,13,14), Tom Pernice Jr.

11. Top eight players and ties from 1989 PGA Championship
Andy Bean, Dave Rummells (13)

12. Winners of PGA Tour events since the previous Masters
Tommy Armour III, Ian Baker-Finch, Bill Britton, Curt Byrum, Tom Byrum, Mike Donald (13), Dan Forsman, Robert Gamez, Wayne Grady (13), Donnie Hammond (13), Mike Hulbert (13), John Huston, David Ishii, Steve Jones (13), John Mahaffey (13), Blaine McCallister (13), Ted Schulz (13), Tony Sills, Tim Simpson (13), Leonard Thompson

Stan Utley, the winner of the Chattanooga Classic was not invited.

13. Top 30 players from the 1989 PGA Tour money list
Bill Glasson, Wayne Levi, Hal Sutton

14. Members of the U.S. 1989 Ryder Cup team
Lanny Wadkins

15. Special foreign invitation
Naomichi Ozaki, Craig Parry, Ronan Rafferty, Peter Senior

Round summaries

First round
Thursday, April 5, 1990

Source:

Second round
Friday, April 6, 1990

Source:

Amateurs: Patton (E), Dodd (+11), Hobby (+14), Green (+15), Taylor (+17)

Third round
Saturday, April 7, 1990

Source:

Final round
Sunday, April 8, 1990

Final leaderboard

Sources:

Scorecard

Cumulative tournament scores, relative to par
{|class="wikitable" span = 50 style="font-size:85%;
|-
|style="background: Red;" width=10|
|Eagle
|style="background: Pink;" width=10|
|Birdie
|style="background: PaleGreen;" width=10|
|Bogey
|style="background: Green;" width=10|
|Double bogey
|}
Source:

Playoff

Sudden-death playoff began on hole #10 and ended at hole #11, when Faldo parred.

References

External links
Masters.com – Past winners and results
Augusta.com – 1990 Masters leaderboard and scorecards

1990
1990 in golf
1990 in American sports
1990 in sports in Georgia (U.S. state)
April 1990 sports events in the United States